This is a list of diplomatic missions of Eritrea. Eritrea is a comparatively young country that has tense relations with some of its neighbours, especially Ethiopia. Eritrea has relatively good relations with Djibouti and improving relations with Sudan and Yemen. It has a limited number of diplomatic missions around the world.

In 2007, the Eritrean government was ordered by the United States Department of State to shut down the consulate in Oakland, California which served a community of 7,000 in the San Francisco Bay Area; many Eritreans said that this would be a hardship to them. This action was in retaliation for restrictions imposed by the Eritrean government on the travel of US diplomats in Eritrea, interference with the diplomatic pouch and the inability to provide consular services to U.S. citizens in Eritrea.

Africa

 Djibouti City (Embassy)

 Cairo (Embassy)

 Addis Ababa (Embassy)

 Nairobi (Embassy)

 Tripoli (Embassy)

 Abuja (Embassy)

 Pretoria (Embassy)

 Juba (Embassy)

 Khartoum (Embassy)

 Kampala (Embassy)

Americas

 Toronto (Consulate General)

 Washington, D.C. (Embassy)

Asia

 Beijing (Embassy)

 New Delhi (Embassy)

 Tel Aviv (Embassy)

 Tokyo (Embassy)

 Kuwait City (Embassy)

 Islamabad (Embassy)

 Doha (Embassy)

 Riyadh (Embassy)
 Jeddah (Consulate)

 Damascus (Embassy)

 Abu Dhabi (Embassy)
 Dubai (Consulate)

 Sanaa (Embassy)

Europe

 Brussels (Embassy)

 Paris (Embassy)

 Berlin (Embassy)
 Frankfurt (Consulate-General)

 Rome (Embassy)
 Milan (Consulate)

 The Hague (Embassy)

 Moscow (Embassy)

 Stockholm (Embassy)

 Geneva (Consulate)

 London (Embassy)

Oceania

 Melbourne (Consulate)

Multilateral organisations
 African Union
Addis Ababa (Permanent Mission to the African Union)

Cairo (Delegation to the Arab League)

Geneva (Permanent Mission to the United Nations)
New York City (Permanent Mission to the United Nations)

Gallery

See also
 Foreign relations of Eritrea
 List of diplomatic missions in Eritrea

References

Eritrea
Diplomatic missions